Klabat Stadium is a multi-use stadium in Manado, North Sulawesi, Indonesia.  It is currently used mostly for football matches and is used as the home venue for Persma Manado and Sulut United.  The stadium holds 10,000 people. The stadium is used for the friendly match between PSV Eindhoven and Persma Manado in the era of the 90s.

References

Persma Manado
Football venues in Indonesia
Buildings and structures in North Sulawesi
Manado